Manuel Zapata Olivella (Santa Cruz of Lorica, Córdoba, 17 March 1920 – Bogota, 19 November 2004) was a doctor, anthropologist and Colombian writer.

Biography 
When he was a boy, his father, the professor Antonio María Zapata Vásquez, moved with his family to Cartagena de Indias. Zapata Olivella's younger sister, Delia Zapata Olivella, was a Colombian dancer and folklorist.

He studied Medicine in the National University of Colombia, in Bogota. In Mexico City, he worked in the Psychiatric Sanatorium of Dr. Ramírez and afterwards in the Hospital Ortopédico of Alfonso Ortiz Thrown. He also worked for the magazine Time and for the magazine Events for All. It argued against his brother Virgil by defending the United States, but he later changed his mind after being racially discriminated during a trip to the country.

During his stay in Mexico, he wrote the unpublished novel "Bitter Rice". He published several studies on the cultures of Afrocolombians. He taught in several universities of United States, Canada, Central America, and Africa. He founded and directed the literary magazine National Letters.

The main theme of his narrative is the history and the culture of the inhabitants of the Colombian Caribbean, especially the lives of blacks and natives. His most important work is the novel Changó (1983), an extensive work that is presented as an epic of the afroamericanos, narrating their origins in Africa. In a sense, Changó is a culmination of all of his previous writings.

His previous novel In Chimá is born a saint (1964) was a finalist in two contests, the Esso of 1963, in which it was defeated by Gabriel García Márquez with The bad hour, and the Prize of Brief Novel Seix Barral, in which first place went to The city and the dogs by Mario Vargas Llosa.

Works

Short stories 
 1948 – Pasión vagabunda
 1952 – He visto la noche
 1954 – China 6 am
 1961 – Cuentos de muerte y libertad
 1962 – El cirujano de la selva
 1967 – ¿Quién dio el fusil a Oswald?
 1990 – Fábulas de Tamalameque

Novels 

 1947 – Tierra mojada
 1960 – La calle 10
 1963 – Detrás del rostro
 1963 – Chambacú, corral de negros, honorable mention at the Premio Casa de las Américas (1963)
 1964 – En Chimá nace un santo
 1983 – Changó, el Gran Putas 1983 – Historia de un Joven Negro
 1986 – El fusilamiento del Diablo
 1989 – Hemingway, el cazador de la Muerte

Essays

 1997 – "La rebelión de los genes"

Works in English 
Chambacu, Black Slum, translator Jonathan Tittler, Latin American Literary Review Press, 1989, 
Changó, the Biggest Badass, translator Jonathan Tittler, Texas Tech University Press, 2010,

See also 
 Literature of Colombia

References

External links
Colombian oral history archive, Manuel Zapata Olivella Collection of Vanderbilt University Special Collections

2004 deaths
Colombian folklorists
1920 births
Colombian people of African descent
Colombian male novelists
Colombian male short story writers
20th-century Colombian novelists
20th-century short story writers
20th-century male writers
People from Córdoba Department
Colombian expatriates in Mexico